Isidro Ramon Antonio Ayora Cueva (31 August 1879 – 22 March 1978) was an Ecuadorian political figure. He served as the 22nd President of Ecuador from 1926 to 1931. Isidro Ayora, a town in Guayas, and Puerto Ayora, are named after him. Some people name coins ayora because they were introduced by him.

Honours 
1930: Grand Cordon in the Order of Leopold.

References

ISIDRO AYORA CUEVA . diccionariobiograficoecuador.com
Dictadura Del Dr. Isidro Ayora Cueva . explored.com.ec

1879 births
1978 deaths
People from Loja, Ecuador
Ecuadorian people of Spanish descent
Ecuadorian Radical Liberal Party politicians
Presidents of Ecuador
Grand Crosses with Star and Sash of the Order of Merit of the Federal Republic of Germany